was a Japanese manga artist from Yamagata prefecture.

Satō created the manga Bachi Bachi, a sumo series that ran in Weekly Shōnen Champion from 2009 to 2012. Bachi Bachi went on to spawn two sequel series, Bachi Bachi BURST and Samejima, Saigo no Jūgonichi. Satō suffered a sudden death on 3 July 2018 at the age of 41 due to acute coronary syndrome. Samejima, Saigo no Jūgonichi was still running at the time of his death, and the last issue was published in July 2018. The final chapters were compiled into the 20th volume, which went on to be published posthumously in October of the same year.

Sumo magazine Great Sumo Journal honored Satō with a special issue following his death, which featured the main character of Bachi Bachi.「バチバチ」シリーズの鮫島が相撲雑誌の表紙に登場、佐藤タカヒロ追悼企画も (MyNavi News article about the special issue) マイナビニュース （株式会社マイナビ、31 August 2018）

Bibliography 

 Ippon (いっぽん!), Weekly Shōnen Champion, 2004–2006, 14 volumes
 Bachi Bachi (バチバチ), Weekly Shōnen Champion, 2009–2012, 16 volumes
 Bachi Bachi Burst (バチバチ BURST), Weekly Shōnen Champion, 2012–2014, 12 volumes
 Samejima, Saigo no Jūgonichi (鮫島、最後の十五日), Weekly Shōnen Champion, 2014–2018, 20 volumes

References

1977 births
2018 deaths
Manga artists
Manga writers
20th-century Japanese artists
21st-century Japanese artists
Japanese cartoonists
People from Yamagata Prefecture